Majidi is an Iranian and Arabic surname. Notable people with the surname include:

 Abdol Majid Majidi (1928–2014), Iranian politician
 Falah Al-Majidi (born 1970), Kuwaiti football player
 Farhad Majidi (born 1976), Iranian football player
 Farzad Majidi (born 1977), Iranian football player
 Khazal Al Majidi (born 1951), Iraqi Assyriologist and academic
 Meysam Majidi (born 1986), Iranian football player
 Majid Majidi (born 1959), Iranian film director
 Minoo Majidi (1960–2022), Iranian woman killed in the September 2022 Iranian protests
 Mohammad Taghi Majidi (1911–1979), Iranian army officer
 Mounir Majidi (born 1965), Moroccan businessman
 Mouzhan Majidi (born 1964), British-Iranian architect
 Selma Al-Majidi (born 1990), Sudanese football manager
 Shahin Majidi (born 1988), Iranian football player

Arabic-language surnames
Iranian-language surnames